Cannibals is the nineteenth album by guitarist/vocalist Richie Kotzen.

Track listing

Personnel
 Richie Kotzen – all instruments
 August Eve Kotzen - Piano on 'You'
 Billy Sheehan - Low Lead Vocals on 'Stand Tall'
 Dug Pinnick - Co-lead  Vocal and additional background vocals on 'I'm All In'
 Julia Lage - Additional Voices on 'Stand Tall', background vocals on 'Up (You Turn Me)' and 'In An Instant'
 Mike Bennet - Percussion on 'Shake It Off'
 Elisabetta Sheehan - Additional Voices on 'Stand Tall'
 Gang vocals on 'Come On Free' by the 'Gambiarria Choir' (Julia Lage, Lineu Andrade, Renata Caldas, Bill Waters, Felipe Raposo)

References
 https://www.allmusic.com/album/cannibals-mw0002830070
 http://bluesrockreview.com/2015/01/richie-kotzen-cannibals-review.html

2015 albums
Richie Kotzen albums